The Fire of Moscow occurred on 24 May 1571, when the Crimean and Ottoman Army (8,000 Crimean Tatars, 33,000 irregular Ottomans and 7,000 janissaries) led by the khan of Crimea Devlet I Giray, bypassed the Serpukhov defensive fortifications on the Oka River, crossed the Ugra River, and rounded the flank of the 60,000-man  Russian army.

Prelude
The sentry troops of Russians were crushed by the Crimean-Turkish forces. Not having forces to stop the invasion, the Russian army retreated to Moscow. The rural Russian population also fled to the capital. After defeating the Russian army, the Crimean-Turkish forces besieged the town of Moscow, because in 1556 and 1558 Muscovy, violating the oath given to the Giray dynasty, attacked the lands of the Crimean Khanate — Moscow troops invaded the Crimea and burned villages and towns in the Western and Eastern Crimea, with many Crimean Tatars captured or killed. In 1561, Muscovites "received a letter from the Patriarch of Constantinople" (which turned out to be false), which asserted the rights of Ivan the Terrible to claim himself the Tsar. By 1563, relations between the Muscovy and the Crimean Khanate finally deteriorated.

By 23 May 1571 Tatar troops approached Moscow, setting up a camp near Kolomenskoye. At the same time, Russian voivodes entered the city. The army of Ivan Belsky stood on Bolshaya Street, and the regiment of Ivan Mstislavsky and Ivan Sheremetev on Yakimanka. The advanced regiment of Mikhail Vorotynsky and Pyotr Tatev stood on the Tagansky meadow, while the army of Vasily Tiomkin-Rostovsky was behind Neglinnaya. According to chroniclers, "Prince Ivan Dmitrievich Belskoy went against the Crimean people across the Moscow River to the meadow behind the Swamp and did business with them." During the battle, the Crimeans pushed back the Russians, Prince Belsky was wounded, and a fire rapidly spread through the city.

Fire
The Crimean Tatar and Ottoman forces set the suburbs on fire on 24 May and a sudden wind blew the flames into Moscow and the city went up in a conflagration. According to Heinrich von Staden, a German in the service of Ivan the Terrible (he claimed to be a member of the Oprichnina)," the city, the palace, the Oprichnina palace, and the suburbs burned down completely in six hours.  It was a great disaster because no one could escape." People fled into stone churches to escape the flames, but the stone churches collapsed (either from the intensity of the fire or the pressure of the crowds.) People also jumped into the Moscow River to escape, where many drowned.  The powder magazine of the Kremlin exploded and those hiding in the cellar there asphyxiated. The tsar ordered the dead found on the streets to be thrown into the river, which overflowed its banks and flooded parts of the town.  Jerome Horsey wrote that it took more than a year to clear away all the bodies.

It was one of the most severe fires in the history of the city. Historians estimate the number of casualties of the fire from 60,000 to as many over 200,000 people. Foreigners visiting the city before and after the fire have described a noticeable decrease in the city population, and Ivan the Terrible avoided the city for several years after the fire due to the lack of suitable habitation for him and his entourage. The khan's attempt to repeat the raid in 1572 was repelled in the Battle of Molodi.

References

Sources
 
 
 

1571
16th-century fires
16th century in Moscow
Russo-Turkish wars
1571 in Russia
Military raids
1571
Urban fires in Europe